John T. Williams (September 6, 1864 – February 15, 1944) was a member of the Wisconsin State Assembly.

Biography
Williams was born on September 6, 1864, in Columbia County, Wisconsin. He became a farmer. Williams died at a nursing home in Sun Prairie, Wisconsin in 1944 and was buried in Dodgeville, Wisconsin.

Electoral career
Williams was elected to the Assembly in 1916 and 1918. Previously, he was elected sheriff of Iowa County, Wisconsin in 1912. He had been appointed undersheriff the year before. Williams was a Republican.

References

External links

People from Columbia County, Wisconsin
People from Iowa County, Wisconsin
Republican Party members of the Wisconsin State Assembly
Wisconsin sheriffs
American deputy sheriffs
Farmers from Wisconsin
1864 births
1944 deaths